Live in Sacramento 1964 is a live album by The Beach Boys, released on December 2, 2014, exclusively through the iTunes Store. It was recorded in 1964, with some performances appearing on the band's first live album, Beach Boys Concert, in 1964.

Background

The compilation's release was a result of revised European copyright laws, forcing some labels to publish unreleased archival material so that they would not lose their copyright. Live in Sacramento is one of two such releases by Capitol Records in 2014; the other was Keep an Eye on Summer.

Track listing
First Show
"Little Honda"
"Papa-Oom-Mow-Mow"
"The Little Old Lady from Pasadena"
"Hushabye"
"Hawaii"
"Let's Go Trippin'"
"The Wanderer"
"Surfer Girl"
"Monster Mash"
"Be True to Your School"
"Graduation Day"
"Surfin' USA"
"Don't Back Down"
"Don't Worry Baby"
"Wendy"
"I Get Around"
"Fun, Fun, Fun"

Second Show
"Concert Intro"
"Little Honda"
"Fun, Fun, Fun"
"The Little Old Lady from Pasadena"
"Hushabye"
"Hawaii"
"Let's Go Trippin'"
"The Wanderer"
"Wendy"
"Monster Mash"
"Surfer Girl"
"Be True to Your School"
"Graduation Day"
"Surfin' USA"
"Don't Back Down"
"Don't Worry Baby"
"I Get Around"
"Encore: Papa-Oom-Mow-Mow"

Rehearsals
"Little Honda"
"Papa-Oom-Mow-Mow"

References

2014 live albums
Albums produced by Brian Wilson
Albums produced by Mark Linett
The Beach Boys live albums
Capitol Records compilation albums
Live albums published posthumously
ITunes-exclusive releases
Copyright extension compilation albums